was the sixteenth of the fifty-three stations of the Tōkaidō. It is located in the Shimizu-ku area of Shizuoka, Shizuoka Prefecture, Japan. It is one of four former post stations located in Shimizu-ku.

Area information
At the Tōkaidō Yui-shuku Omoshiro Shukubakan, visitors can experience various aspects of life in the Edo period shukuba, ranging from schooling and lodging, to working and socializing.

The area is known for its sakura ebi, a type of small shrimp.

In the classic ukiyo-e print by Andō Hiroshige (Hōeidō edition) from 1831–1834, Hiroshige chose not to depict the post station at all, but instead shows travelers climbing a very steep mountain pass.

Neighboring post towns
Tōkaidō
Kanbara-juku - Yui-shuku - Okitsu-juku

Further reading
Carey, Patrick. Rediscovering the Old Tokaido:In the Footsteps of Hiroshige. Global Books UK (2000). 
Chiba, Reiko. Hiroshige's Tokaido in Prints and Poetry. Tuttle. (1982) 
Taganau, Jilly. The Tokaido Road: Travelling and Representation in Edo and Meiji Japan. RoutledgeCurzon (2004).

References

Stations of the Tōkaidō
Stations of the Tōkaidō in Shizuoka Prefecture